A Night in the Archipelago (Swedish: En skärgårdsnatt) is a 1953 Swedish drama film directed by Bengt Logardt and starring Ingrid Thulin, Bengt Blomgren and Öllegård Wellton. It was shot at the Centrumateljéerna Studios and on location at a variety of places around the Stockholm Archipelago.

Cast
 Ingrid Thulin as 	Ingrid
 Bengt Logardt as	Åke
 Bengt Blomgren as 	Björn
 Öllegård Wellton as 	Annika
 Rune Halvarsson as 	Sture Svensson
 Britta Brunius as 	Karin Svensson
 Catrin Westerlund as 	Astrid
 Gunlög Hagberg as 	Gullan
 Sten Gester as 	Bosse Levhagen
 Arne Ragneborn as 	'Stålis'
 Lissi Alandh as 	Birgitta
 Tor Bergner as 	Dansbanegitarristen
 Julie Bernby as 	Servitris på Waxholm III
 Bernt Callenbo as Rolf
 Märta Dorff as 	Fru Lundkvist
 Gerd Ericsson as Liss, Ingrids väninna
 Bo Gunnar Eriksson as 	Tomas
 Sten Hedlund as	Helge Lundkvist, ingenjör
 Sven Holmberg as 	Fjärdingsman
 Magnus Kesster as Hans kamrat
 Birgitta Kings as 	Christina
 Lennart Lundh as 	Hjalle, Bosses kamrat
 Jan-Olof Rydqvist as 	Kurre Hängläpp, kompis until Stålis
 Nils Stödberg as 	Fagerviksbo
 Anders Svahn as 	Fjärdingsmans medhjälpare
 Alf Östlund as 	Aff
 Ann-Margret Bjellder as 	Elsa 
 Ingegerd Bjellder as 	Marta

References

Bibliography 
 Qvist, Per Olov & von Bagh, Peter. Guide to the Cinema of Sweden and Finland. Greenwood Publishing Group, 2000.

External links 
 

1953 films
Swedish drama films
1953 drama films
1950s Swedish-language films
Films directed by Bengt Logardt
Films set in Stockholm
1950s Swedish films